Keelan Giles (born 29 January 1997) is a Welsh rugby union player, who plays for the Ospreys as a winger. He is a Wales under-20 international and received a call up to the Welsh senior team for their 2016 tour of New Zealand. He made the final three in BBC's Young Sports Personality of the Year 2016 along with Ellie Robinson and Amy Tinkler.

Club career
Born in Swansea, he played his mini and junior rugby for Loughor RFC and then Waunarlwydd RFC, before he joined the Ospreys age-grade system, representing them at U16 and U18 level, as well as Swansea RFC. He undertook his education at Gower College Swansea.

International career
A Wales under-20 international, Giles and received a call up to the Welsh senior team for their 2016 tour of New Zealand.
He was called in to the senior squad for Wales' 2016 Autumn International Series to cover injuries. Despite being named as a replacement for Wales' match against Japan, he stayed on the bench and was not called on to play. In May 2017 he was named in the Wales senior squad for the tests against Tonga and Samoa in June 2017.

References

External links 
Ospreys profile

1998 births
Living people
Ospreys (rugby union) players
Rugby union players from Swansea
Welsh rugby union players
Rugby union wings